The UTSA Roadrunners women's basketball team represents the University of Texas at San Antonio in women's basketball. The school competes in Conference USA in Division I of the National Collegiate Athletic Association (NCAA). The Roadrunners play home basketball games at Convocation Center in San Antonio, Texas.

History
As of the end of the 2015–16 season, the Roadrunners have an all-time record of 493–500 since beginning play in 1981. From 1992–2012, they played in the Southland Conference, before joining Conference USA in 2013 after one year in the Western Athletic Conference.

The women's basketball team qualified for the 2008 Women's NCAA tournament and 2009 Women's NCAA tournament.
The women's basketball team wins the regular season Southland Conference (SLC) championship in 2002–03.
The women's basketball team wins first-ever Southland Conference Championship in 2008.
The women's basketball team wins Southland Conference regular season Title in 2009.
The women's basketball team wins Southland Conference Championship in 2009.
The women's basketball team clinches the 2011 Southland Conference West Division Championship.

Seasons

NCAA tournament results

References

External links